Phospholipase A2, group 1B is an enzyme that in humans is encoded by the PLA2G1B gene.

Function 

Phospholipase A2 (EC 3.1.1.4) catalyzes the release of fatty acids from glycero-3-phosphocholines. The best known varieties are the digestive enzymes secreted as zymogens by the pancreas of mammals as well as fish. Sequences of pancreatic PLA2 enzymes from a variety of mammals have been reported. One striking feature of these enzymes is their close homology to venom phospholipases of snakes. Other forms of PLA2 have been isolated from brain, liver, lung, spleen, intestine, macrophages, leukocytes, erythrocytes, inflammatory exudates, chondrocytes, and platelets (Seilhamer et al., 1986) .

References

Further reading